Athanasia is a genus of flowering plants in the daisy family.

 Species
Athanasia is native to southern Africa. The name is derived from the Greek a-, 'without', and thanatos 'death', alluding to the persistent dry involucral bracts.

References

Asteraceae genera
Flora of Southern Africa
Anthemideae